Lyu Yueyun (born 13 November 1995) is a Chinese footballer who plays as a midfielder. She has been a member of the China women's national team.

References

1995 births
Living people
Chinese women's footballers
Women's association football midfielders
China women's international footballers